This is the results breakdown of the local elections held in the Balearic Islands on 10 June 1987. The following tables show detailed results in the autonomous community's most populous municipalities, sorted alphabetically.

Overall

City control
The following table lists party control in the most populous municipalities, including provincial capitals (shown in bold). Gains for a party are displayed with the cell's background shaded in that party's colour.

Municipalities

Calvià

Ciutadella de Menorca
Population: 18,905

Ibiza
Population: 27,384

Inca
Population: 21,701

Llucmajor
Population: 15,505

Manacor
Population: 24,345

Maó-Mahón
Population: 21,627

Palma
Population: 295,136

Santa Eulària des Riu
Population: 14,059

See also
1987 Balearic regional election

References

Balearic Islands
1987